The 2020–21 season was PSV Eindhoven's 108th season in existence and the club's 65th consecutive season in the top flight of Dutch football. In addition to the domestic league, PSV participated in this season's edition of the KNVB Cup and also participated in the UEFA Europa League. The season covers the period from 1 July 2020 to 30 June 2021.

Players

First-team squad

Players out on loan

Transfers

In

Out

Pre-season and friendlies

Competitions

Overview

Eredivisie

League table

Results summary

Results by round

Matches
The league fixtures were announced on 24 July 2020.

KNVB Cup

UEFA Europa League

Qualifying rounds and play-off round

Group stage

The group stage draw was held on 2 October 2020.

Knockout phase

Round of 32
The draw for the round of 32 was held on 14 December 2020.

Statistics

Appearances and goals

|-
! colspan="18" style="background:#dcdcdc; text-align:center"| Goalkeepers

|-
! colspan="18" style="background:#dcdcdc; text-align:center"| Defenders

|-
! colspan="18" style="background:#dcdcdc; text-align:center"| Midfielders

|-
! colspan="18" style="background:#dcdcdc; text-align:center"| Forwards

|-
! colspan="18" style="background:#dcdcdc; text-align:center"| Players transferred out during the season

|}

Goalscorers

References

External links

PSV Eindhoven seasons
PSV Eindhoven
PSV Eindhoven